Arthur Christopher John Soames, Baron Soames,  (12 October 1920 – 16 September 1987) was a British Conservative politician who served as a European Commissioner and the last Governor of Southern Rhodesia. He was previously Member of Parliament (MP) for Bedford from 1950 to 1966. He held several government posts and attained Cabinet rank.

Early life and education 

Soames was born in Penn, Buckinghamshire, England, the son of Captain Arthur Granville Soames (the brother of Olave Baden-Powell, World Chief Guide, both descendants of a brewing family who had joined the landed gentry) by his marriage to Hope Mary Woodbine Parish. His parents divorced while he was a boy, and his mother married her second husband Charles Rhys (later 8th Baron Dynevor), by whom she had further children including Richard Rhys, 9th Baron Dynevor.

Soames was educated at West Downs School, Eton College, and the Royal Military College at Sandhurst.  He obtained a commission as an officer in the Coldstream Guards just before World War II broke out.  During the war, he served in France, Italy, and North Africa and was awarded the French Croix de Guerre for his actions at the Second Battle of El Alamein in 1942.

Political career 
After military service during the Second World War, Soames served as the Assistant Military Attaché in Paris. He was the Conservative MP for Bedford from 1950 to 1966 and served under Anthony Eden as Under-Secretary of State for Air from 1955 to 1957 and under Harold Macmillan as Parliamentary and Financial Secretary to the Admiralty from 1957 to 1958. In the 1955 Birthday Honours, he was invested as Commander of the Order of the British Empire (CBE).

In 1958 he was sworn of the Privy Council. He served under Macmillan as Secretary of State for War (outside the Cabinet) from 1958 to 1960 and then in the cabinets of Macmillan and his successor Alec Douglas-Home as Minister of Agriculture, Fisheries and Food from July 1960 to 1964. Home had promised to promote him to Foreign Secretary if the Conservatives won the 1964 general election, but they did not.

Between 1965 and 1966, Soames was Shadow Foreign Secretary under Edward Heath. He lost his seat in Parliament in the 1966 election. In 1968 Harold Wilson appointed him Ambassador to France, where he served until 1972. During his tenure as ambassador, he was involved in the February 1969 "Soames affair", following a private meeting between Soames and French president Charles de Gaulle, the latter offering bilateral talks concerning a partnership for Britain in a larger and looser European union, the talks not involving other members. The British government eventually refused the offer, and that for a time strained Franco-British relations. He was then a Vice-President of the European Commission from 1973 to 1976. He was considered as a potential challenger to Edward Heath in the 1975 Conservative Party leadership election. The eventual winner Margaret Thatcher would have withdrawn if he had stood.  He was created a life peer on 19 April 1978 as Baron Soames, of Fletching in the County of East Sussex.

He served as the interim governor of Southern Rhodesia from 1979 to 1980, charged with administering the terms of the Lancaster House Agreement and overseeing its governmental transition into Zimbabwe. From 1979 to 1981, he was Lord President of the Council and Leader of the House of Lords under Margaret Thatcher, concurrent with his duties in Southern Rhodesia.

Outside politics 
Soames served as president of the Royal Agricultural Society of England in 1973, was a non-executive director of N.M. Rothschild and Sons Ltd 1977–79, and a director of the Nat West Bank 1978–79.

Family 

Lord Soames married Mary Churchill, the youngest child of Winston and Clementine Churchill, on 11 February 1947. They had five children:

Death 

Lord Soames died from pancreatitis aged 66. His ashes were buried within the Churchill plot at St Martin's Church, Bladon, near Woodstock, Oxfordshire.

Honours 
In date order:

Croix de Guerre 1939–1945 (France) – 1942
Commander of the Order of the British Empire (CBE) (Civil division) – 1955
Knight Grand Cross of the Order of St Michael and St George (GCMG) – 1972
Knight Grand Cross of the Royal Victorian Order (GCVO) – 1972
Grand Officer of the Legion of Honour (France) – 1972
Robert Schuman Prize – 1976
Companion of Honour (CH) – 1980

Arms

References

Bibliography

External links 

 
 
Time:Festive Birth of a Nation (Zimbabwe)
Maximilian Genealogy Master Database 2000

1920 births
1987 deaths
Agriculture ministers of the United Kingdom
Ambassadors of the United Kingdom to France
British Army personnel of World War II
British European Commissioners
British Secretaries of State
Burials at St Martin's Church, Bladon
Commanders of the Order of the British Empire
Conservative Party (UK) MPs for English constituencies
Conservative Party (UK) life peers
Deaths from pancreatitis
Diplomatic peers
European Commissioners 1973–1977
Governors of Southern Rhodesia
Knights Grand Cross of the Order of St Michael and St George
Knights Grand Cross of the Royal Victorian Order
Leaders of the House of Lords
Lord Presidents of the Council
Lords of the Admiralty
Members of the Order of the Companions of Honour
Members of the Privy Council of the United Kingdom
Ministers in the Eden government, 1955–1957
Ministers in the Macmillan and Douglas-Home governments, 1957–1964
Parliamentary Private Secretaries to the Prime Minister
People educated at West Downs School
Secretaries of State for War (UK)
UK MPs 1950–1951
UK MPs 1951–1955
UK MPs 1955–1959
UK MPs 1959–1964
UK MPs 1964–1966
UK MPs who were granted peerages
Life peers created by Elizabeth II